Fabio Veras Villas Boas Pereira (born 19 October 1991) is a retired Brazilian footballer who last played for the Seattle Sounders FC of Major League Soccer.

Career

Youth and college 
Pereira was a four-year starter in for the University of Michigan where he scored 12 times in 78 appearances for the Wolverines.

Professional 
Pereira was the very final pick of the 2014 MLS SuperDraft, being drafted in the fourth round and 77th overall by the Seattle Sounders FC. Pereira signed on a contract with Seattle in February 2014. On June 18, 2014, Pereira made his lone appearance with the Sounders, coming on for the final 23 minutes in a 5-0 win over PSA Elite in the fourth round proper of the U.S. Open Cup.

He was waived at the end of the 2014 season. He subsequently signed with Uberlândia of the Série D in his native Brazil.

References

External links 
 Fabio Pereira Michigan Profile
 
 

1991 births
Living people
Brazilian footballers
Brazilian expatriate footballers
Expatriate soccer players in the United States
Brazilian expatriate sportspeople in the United States
Detroit City FC players
Seattle Sounders FC players
Michigan Wolverines men's soccer players
Uberlândia Esporte Clube players
National Premier Soccer League players
Campeonato Brasileiro Série D players
Seattle Sounders FC draft picks
Association football midfielders
Footballers from São Paulo